Losinoostrovskaya is a railway station located in Losinoostrovsky District of Moscow, Russia. The station serves suburban traffic of Yaroslavsky suburban railway line by Moscow Railway. The southbound trains terminate at Moscow Yaroslavskaya railway station in Moscow. All suburban trains stop at Losinoostrovskaya. The station is operated by the Moscow Railway.

The adjacent station in the northern direction is Los, and the one in the southern direction is Rostokino.

Losinoostrovskaya has access to Menzhinskogo Street, Rudnevoy Street, and Anadysrky Proyezd (west), as well as to Dudinka Street and Khibinsky Proyezd (east). The public bus traffic is organized. The station is surrounded by a residential area.

History
The first summer houses were constructed in the area in 1898. In the same year, a railway station, Platform of the 10th versta was open to serve the houses. In 1904, a settlement of Losinoostrovsky was officially established. The name came from the nearby Losiny Ostrov Forest, currently Losiny Ostrov National Park. In 1908, the Moscow Encircle Railway was completed, and the Platform of the 10th versta, renamed to Losinoostrovskaya, became a large freight station. In addition to the freight yard, there was a locomotive depot. In November 1924, the settlement of Losinoostrovsky was renamed Losinoostrovsk and was granted a town status. In 1939 it was renamed Babushkin, after Mikhail Babushkin, and in 1960, Babushkin was merged into Moscow. In 1929, the railway line between Moscow and Mytishchi, including Losinoostrovskaya, was electrified.

In 1900, a railway line connecting Beskudnikovo and Losinoostrovskaya was constructed. This was done in order to facilitate the railway traffic between Moscow and Kimry (Savyolovo), since Moscow Savyolovsky railway station was not open yet. After a tram line from central line to Medvedkovo was built, in 1966 a direct connection to Losinoostrovskaya was discontinued, and the whole railway line was demolished in 1987.

References

Railway stations in Moscow
Railway stations of Moscow Railway
Railway stations in the Russian Empire opened in 1898
North-Eastern Administrative Okrug